The Ibrox International Challenge Trophy was a short-lived preseason football tournament held at Ibrox Park in 1994 and 1995 and contested by teams from Europe, including the hosts Rangers of Scotland.

Results

1994 

Newcastle United beat Manchester United 6–5 on penalties.

1995

See also
 Tennent Caledonian Cup

References

External links 

Defunct international club association football competitions in Europe
International sports competitions in Glasgow
Scottish football friendly trophies
Defunct football cup competitions in Scotland
Rangers F.C.
1994–95 in Scottish football
1995–96 in Scottish football
Football in Glasgow